Christ the King College, Onitsha (CKC), popularly known as CKC Onitsha, or Amaka Boys, is a Catholic all-boys secondary school in Onitsha, Nigeria. It is ranked the top-ranked high school in Nigeria and 36th in the top 100 best high schools in Africa as of February 2014. 

CKC was founded on February 2, 1933, by the late Archbishop Charles Heerey, CsSp, along with Fredrick Akpali Modebe and his wife Margret, who (like in the other schools they founded) not only provided the land, but also built the first administration block and the first hostel accommodation. Heerey remained the proprietor of the school until his death in the spring of 1967. 

The chief mission of the school is to develop indigenous manpower and leadership skills from the vast pool of Nigerian youths and in a Catholic tradition and environment. The first principal of the college was Fr Leo Brolly and the first student to be admitted into the college was Peter Charles Obi Nwagbogu

History

CKC was affected adversely by the Nigerian Civil War (1967–1970). Most of its infrastructure was destroyed. The school was taken over by the East Central State Government in 1973 and renamed "Heerey High School", after its founder. However, following representations by its alumni, the school's name was changed back to its original name, "Christ The King College (CKC)" in 1976, and the pre-war first indigenous principal of the school, Rev. Fr. Nicholas Tagbo, was also brought back that year to  reorganize, rebuild, and re-energize the school. CKC was finally returned to the Catholic Mission by the state government on 1 January 2009.

The school
CKC is located on Oguta Road in Onitsha, Anambra State, Nigeria. Its motto is Bonitas, Disciplina, Scientia (Latin) (Goodness, Discipline, and Knowledge). As of February 2014, the school is currently ranked the number 1 (the best) high school in Nigeria,  and 36th in the top 100 best secondary schools in Africa. The school's colours are White and Royal Blue. The college has active alumni associations in Nigeria (Abuja, Benin-City, Enugu, Lagos, Onitsha, Owerri, and Port-Harcourt), and in the United States ("Christ the King College Onitsha Alumni Association USA").

School population
Throughout the years prior to the civil war, the school's population was pegged at 600 to ensure appropriate student/teacher ratio and high-quality education. After the civil war, in the 1970s, the student population ballooned to over 4,000. However, following years of reorganization, the school's student population is now 2,597, split between (Grades 7- 12); Junior Secondary School (1,350) and Senior Secondary School(1,247).

Sporting and extra-curricular activities

The school plays Association Football, track and field athletics, handball, hockey and lawn tennis. Its football (soccer) team won the World Secondary School Championship in Dublin, Ireland in 1977.

Houses

The dormitories are classified as school houses for administration, management and sports competition purposes. The current houses are:  Tagbo, Brolly, Azikiwe, Heerey, Okagbue, Modebe, Arinze, Aniogu, Mbanefo, Orjiakor, Allagoa, Butler, and Flanagan.

The pre-civil war Houses were: St. Charles, St. Gabriel, St Williams, St Michael's, and St. Joseph.

School publications

The X-Ray (Students)
Bonitas (Students)
The Amaka Gazette (Alumni)
Amaka's Voice (Alumni)

List of principals

1st Rev Fr. W.L. Brolly: 1933–1937
2nd Rev. Fr. M Flanagan: 1938–1941
3rd Rev. Fr J. Keane: 1942–1943
4th Rev. Fr. A. Callaghan: 1943
5th Rev. Fr. M. Flanagan: 1943–1948
6th Rev. Fr. M. Clifford: 1949–1953
7th Rev. Fr. W Butler: 1953–1954
8th Rev. Fr. J. Keane: 1955–1956
9th Rev. Fr. J. FitzPatrick: 1956–1963
10th Rev. Fr. N. C. Tagbo: 1963–1972 (First indigenous principal)
11th Chief A.A.O. Ezenwa: 1973–1974
12th Rev. H. Chiwuzie: 1974–1975
13th Mr. P. E. Ezeokeke: 1975–1976
14th Rev. Fr. N.C. Tagbo: 1976–1985
15th Mr. M. N. Enemou: 1985–1987
16th Rev. Dr. V. A. Nwosu: 1987–1996
17th Mr. J.E. Chukwurah: 1996–1997
18th Mr. E. C. Umeh: 1997–2000
19th Chief N. E. Olisah: 2000–2008
20th Chief A. Obika: 2008–2009
21st Mr. E. Ezenduka: 2009–2010
22nd Rev. Fr. Charles Okwumuo: 2010–2019
23rd Rev. Fr. Dr. Celestine Arinze Okafor: 2019–present

Source: Honor Roll of CKC Principals, 1993–2011

Notable alumni

Olisa Agbakoba (b 29 May 1953) lawyer, former president of Nigeria Bar Association, NBA, and human rights activist.
Justice Anthony Aniagolu, justice of the supreme court of Nigeria and chairman of the 1988–89 Constituent Assembly
 Justice Chukwunweike Idigbe, Justice of the Supreme Court of Nigeria
Chike Francis Ofodile, OFR (November 20, 1924 - August 3, 2014) former Attorney General and the Minister for Justice of Nigeria from (1985 - 1991) and former Judge of the International Court of Justice from (1984 - 1985). He was once the traditional Prime Minister of Onitsha
Gov. Peter Obi (b 19 July 1961) Former governor of Anambra State
Gov. Willie Obiano (b 8 August 1955) Former Governor of Anambra State.
Archbishop Valerian M. Okeke (b 20 October 1953) Archbishop of the Archdiocese of Onitsha since 1 September 2003
Dr. Pius N.C. Okigbo (6 February 1924 – 2000)  economist from Ojoto
John Munonye (April 1929 – 10 May 1999), one of the most prolific Nigerian literary writers of the 20th century, and author of The Only Son (African Writers Series) among many others.
Justice Chukwudifu Akunne Oputa (b 22 September 1924) (retired Justice of the Supreme Court of Nigeria), former Chairman of the Human Rights Violation and Investigation Commission (popularly called Oputa Panel)
Prof. Patrick Utomi (b 6 February 1956) Founder Lagos Business School, African Democratic Congress presidential candidate (2007)
Ezeolisa Allagoa (24 August 1914 – 17 February 2003) was traditional ruler of Nembe Kingdom
Dr. Peter Odili (15 August 1948) Former Executive Governor of Rivers State (1999-2007)
Ezeolisa Allagoa 1st Indigenous Chief Judge of Old Rivers State and Amanyanabo of Nembe
 Mr Oseloka H. Obaze, (b 9 April 1955) Diplomat, politician and author.
Justice Peter N. C Umeadi, (b 4 July 1955), Jurist, Chief Judge of Anambra State.
Arc. Frank Nwobuora MBANEFO, (1927-2015), Class of 1948, (http://www.ckconitshausa.net/uploads/Ode_to_Arc_Mbanefo.pdf) renown international Architect and one of the founding members of the Nigerian Institute of Architects, of which he later became a Fellow and National President. He helped set-up the science and geography lab in CKC in 1948 and was the science tutor, before heading to England in 1950 to study architecture. He was member of the RIBA (Royal Institute of British Architects) and two-time Vice President - AFRICA of the CAA (Commonwealth Association of Architects) in 1963-1965, 1974-1977. He was an influential past national president of the CKC Alumni and worked closely with Principal Fr. Tagbo in improving CKC after the Biafran War.

References

External links
 Alumni web site

Catholic schools in Nigeria
Roman Catholic secondary schools in Nigeria
1933 establishments in Nigeria
Boys' schools in Nigeria
Educational institutions established in 1933